Acedoben (4-acetamidobenzoic acid or N-acetyl-PABA) is a chemical compound with the molecular formula of C9H9NO3.  It is the acetyl derivative of para-aminobenzoic acid (PABA).

Acedoben, as a salt with dimepranol, is a component of some pharmaceutical preparations such as inosine pranobex.

See also
 N-Acetylanthranilic acid is an positional isomer of this compound

References

Acetanilides
Benzoic acids